Tazehabad-e Serias (also Romanized as Tāzehābād-e Serīās) is a village in Mansur-e Aqai Rural District, Shahu District, Ravansar County, Kermanshah Province, Iran. At the 2006 census, its population was 767, in 183 families.

References 

Populated places in Ravansar County